Ramesh More (died 1993) was a Shiv Sena politician and a well-known trade union leader from Bombay, India. He served as a Member of the Maharashtra Legislative Council. He also served as the General Secretary of Bhartiya Kamgar Sena (BKS), a trade union.

His name also appeared in the 1993 Bombay riots.

He was shot dead in  1993 in Bombay's Andheri suburb. He was killed allegedly by Arun Gawli's gang on receiving a contract.

An article published in 2000 by the CPIM's The Marxist wrote, Even before the SS-BJP had come to power, some of their MLAs and corporators had been killed as a result of their involvement with mafia gangs and shady rackets concerning land, property or extortion.  These included SS MLAs Vithal Chavan and Ramesh More, SS corporators Vinayak Wable and Khimbahadur Thapa, BJP MLA Prem Kumar Sharma and BJP corporator, Ex-MLA and its city president Ramdas Nayak.

References 

Members of the Maharashtra Legislative Council
Year of birth missing
1993 deaths
1993 murders in India
Deaths by firearm in India
Politicians from Mumbai
Assassinated Indian politicians
People murdered in Mumbai
Marathi politicians
Shiv Sena politicians
People from Maharashtra